Julieta Zylberberg (born March 4, 1983) is an Argentine actress.

Career 
Julieta Zylberberg began her career in the children's television program Magazine For Fai, hosted by Mex Urtizberea. In that year she was also in the first chapter of the television series Culpable de este amor and appeared in the miniseries Sangre fría. Then in 2005 she participated in the film Géminis  and played several roles in some episodes of the first season of Casados con hijos. In 2006 she participated in the film Cara de queso and on the television show Bendita vida. A year later, she starred in the film Tres minutos with Nicolás Pauls and Antonella Costa. In 2008, she acted in comedy Una de dos which started on January 28, 2008 and ended on February 21, 2008 by low rating. Because of this, Julieta was left without work, until she was called to make a special participation in the series Aquí no hay quien viva, adaptation of the Spanish version. In that same year, she participated in the miniseries of television and Internet Amanda O.

In 2009 she starred in the Pol-ka telecomedy Enseñame a vivir with Violeta Urtizberea. In 2010, she starred in the movie La mirada invisible and participated in the play Agosto: Condado de Osage working alongside great actresses like Norma Aleandro and Mercedes Morán. A year later, she had a role in the movie Los Marziano starring Guillermo Francella and then played Helena Epstein in the Pol-Ka Producciones televisión series, called Los únicos. In 2012 she acted in Condicionados and starred in the movie Extraños en la noche with the singer and actor Diego Torres. After four years, in 2016, she starred alongside Juan Minujín, Loco x Vos an Argentine comedy, version of the American Mad About You that was broadcast by Telefe.

In 2022, Zylberberg appeared in the science fiction series Night Sky.

Filmography

Television programs

Film

Television

Theatre

Awards and nominations

Personal life 
On 8 December 2012 she had a son, Luis Ernesto, with her partner Esteban Lamothe. On 31 May 2017 she confirmed their separation.

References

External links 

Actresses from Buenos Aires
Argentine film actresses
Argentine stage actresses
Argentine television actresses
Jewish Argentine actresses
Living people
1983 births